Piotr Jan Wróbel (born 1953) is a Polish-Canadian historian and expert specializing in Polish history and Central and Eastern European history. His academic research revolves around the national minorities of Central and Eastern Europe with special focus on Polish-Jewish relations and the history of Polish Jewry since the Partitions of Poland.

Wróbel is currently a Professor in the Department of History at the Faculty of Arts and Science of the University of Toronto, as well as member of the Faculty at the Munk School of Global Affairs at the University of Trinity College in the University of Toronto.

Piotr Wróbel received his Doctor of Philosophy degree (PhD) at the University of Warsaw, where he taught. He also taught at the University of Michigan at Ann Arbor, Michigan State University in East Lansing, as well as at the University of California at Davis. At present, Wróbel teaches history at the University of Toronto. He has been a visiting scholar at the Institute of European History at Mainz, as well as at the Humboldt University of Berlin; and, at the Institute for Polish–Jewish Studies at the University of Oxford.

Wróbel has authored or co-authored seven books, and more than 75 articles published in Poland, Great Britain, Canada, and the United States. He serves on the advisory board of Polin: A Journal of Polish–Jewish Studies.

Selected publications
 Listopadowe dni-1918, 1988, Instytut Wydawniczy P.A.X
 Droga powrotna: niemiecki prawicowy ruch kombatancki po I wojnie światowej, 1989, Książka i Wiedza
 Kształtowanie siȩ białoruskiej świadomości narodowej a Polska, 1990, Wydawnictwa Uniwersytetu Warszawskiego 
 Zarys dziejów Żydów na ziemiach polskich w latach 1880-1918, 1991, Wydawnictwa Uniwersytetu Warszawskiego 
 Prezydenci i premierzy drugiej rzeczypospolitej (with A Chojnowski), 1992, Zakład Narodowy im. Ossolínskich
 The Jews of Galicia under Austrian-Polish Rule, 1869–1918, 1994, Cambridge University Press
 Double memory: Poles and Jews after the Holocaust, 1997, University of Toronto, (view as PDF)
 Historical Dictionary of Poland, 1945-1996.

References

External links
Polish History and Konstanty Reynert Chair of History, Council for Support of Polish Studies at the University of Toronto
Professor Piotr Wróbel, Council for Support of Polish Studies at the University of Toronto
The Devil's Playground: Poland in World War II. The Canadian Foundation for Polish Studies of the Polish Institute of Arts & Sciences. Price-Patterson Ltd. (contains a biography note)

20th-century Polish historians
Polish male non-fiction writers
21st-century Canadian historians
Canadian male non-fiction writers
University of Warsaw alumni
University of Michigan faculty
Michigan State University faculty
University of California, Davis faculty
Polish emigrants to Canada
Living people
1953 births